Hubert Shelby "Hub" "Shucks" Pruett (September 1, 1900 in Malden, Missouri – January 28, 1982 in Ladue, Missouri), was a professional baseball left-handed pitcher in Major League Baseball from  to . He acquired the nickname "Shucks" because that was the strongest word in his vocabulary.

Baseball career
Pruett played for the St. Louis Browns, Philadelphia Phillies, New York Giants, and Boston Braves.

Pruett's claim to fame was that he had a knack for getting out Babe Ruth. However, the fame may have been overstated because he was most successful doing so in his first year in the major leagues, and it was mentioned prominently in newspapers. As time went on, Ruth had more success, and even hit home runs against Pruett. Other than his statistics against Ruth, Pruett was an ordinary pitcher, with a career won-lost record of 29–48 and an earned run average of 4.63. Other pitchers also had better personal records against Ruth.

Personal life
Pruett's father was a physician who died in a horse and buggy accident while making a house call, and Pruett was raised by an aunt. He became a medical student during his early years in baseball and used his baseball pay to finance his medical education. He graduated from the St. Louis University School of Medicine and became a practicing physician. His son Don and grandson Chris also became physicians. In 1948, several weeks before Ruth's death, Pruett was able to personally thank Ruth for this because he felt that his success against him was one of the main reasons he was kept on by the Browns.

Record vs. Babe Ruth

References

External links

 

1900 births
1982 deaths
Major League Baseball pitchers
Baseball players from Missouri
Boston Braves players
St. Louis Browns players
New York Giants (NL) players
Philadelphia Phillies players
People from Malden, Missouri
Missouri Tigers baseball players